Karl Marx: The Story of His Life is a 1918 book about the philosopher Karl Marx by the German historian Franz Mehring. Considered the classical biography of Marx, the work has been translated into many languages, including Russian (1920), Swedish (1921–1922), Danish (1922), Hungarian (1925), Japanese (1930), Spanish (1932), English (1935), and Hebrew (1940–1941).

Reception
The political scientist David McLellan writes that Karl Marx: The Story of His Life is the "classical biography of Marx", adding that it is now "slightly hagiographical" and out of date. In 1953, the philosopher Louis Althusser wrote that it is the "most comprehensive and interesting historical study of Marx".

References

Bibliography
Books

 
 

Online articles

 

1918 non-fiction books
Biographies of Karl Marx
Books by Franz Mehring
German non-fiction books
Covici-Friede books